Jean Pierre Alexandre Antigna (March 7, 1817 – February 26, 1878) was a French painter.

Career
Antigna was born in Orléans, France, where his earliest training took place, under a local painter, François Salmon. On October 9, 1837, he entered the École nationale supérieure des Beaux-Arts in Paris where he was a pupil of Sebastien Norblin de la Gourdaine as well as the renowned Paul Delaroche.

Until 1845 his paintings were generally religious scenes and portraits. Yet, after living in the poor quarter of the Île Saint-Louis in Paris he would incorporate images of the suffering and burden of urban poor into his works. By the 1848 Revolution Antigna was devoted to the Realist style, and continued to paint in this manner until c. 1860 when he began to produce paintings in the Naturalist vein. He exhibited at the Salon and received the Legion of Honour in 1861. He traveled to Spain and Brittany numerous times in order to paint multifarious scenes, yet he always retained his compassion for the poor.

In 1861 Antigna married Hélène Marie Pettit, who became a painter herself. Their son, Andre-Marc Antigna, was also a painter and miniaturist.  He died in Paris.

Works

References

External links

artfact.com
Alexandre Antigna at Art Renewal Center

1817 births
1878 deaths
19th-century French painters
French male painters
French Realist painters
Artists  from Orléans